Tees Maar Khan may refer to:
Mahboob Ali Khan, popularly known as "Tees Maar Khan"
Tees Maar Khan (1955 film), 1955 Indian Hindi-language film
 Tees Maar Khan (1963 film), 1963  Pakistani Punjabi film
 Tees Maar Khan (2010 film), 2010 Indian Hindi-language film
 Tees Maar Khan (2022 film), 2022 Indian Telugu-language film